The 2015 Copa Sudamericana Finals were the two-legged final that decided the winner of the 2015 Copa Sudamericana, the 14th edition of the Copa Sudamericana, South America's secondary international club football tournament organized by CONMEBOL.

The finals were contested in two-legged home-and-away format between Argentine team Huracán and Colombian team Santa Fe. The first leg was hosted by Huracán at Estadio Tomás Adolfo Ducó in Buenos Aires on 2 December 2015, while the second leg was hosted by Santa Fe at Estadio El Campín in Bogotá on 9 December. The winner qualified for the 2016 Copa Libertadores, and earned the right to play against the 2015 Copa Libertadores winners in the 2016 Recopa Sudamericana, and against the 2015 J. League Cup winners in the 2016 Suruga Bank Championship.

As both the first leg and the second leg were tied 0–0, the champion was decided by penalty shoot-out in which Santa Fe won 3–1, winning the tournament for the first time in their history.

Teams

Road to the finals

Note: In all scores below, the score of the home team is given first.

Format
The finals were played on a home-and-away two-legged basis, with the higher-seeded team hosting the second leg. If tied on aggregate, the away goals rule would not be used, and 30 minutes of extra time would be played. If still tied after extra time, the penalty shoot-out would be used to determine the winner.

Matches

First leg

Second leg

See also
2016 Recopa Sudamericana
2016 Suruga Bank Championship

References

External links
Copa Sudamericana 2015, CONMEBOL.com 

Finals
2015
s
s
2015 in Colombian football
2015 in Argentine football
2015 Copa Sudamericana Finals
2015 Copa Sudamericana Finals
Association football penalty shoot-outs
December 2015 sports events in South America